Jean Richard (18 April 1921 – 12 December 2001) was a French actor, comedian, and circus entrepreneur. He is best remembered for his role as Georges Simenon's Maigret in the eponymous French television series, which he played for more than twenty years, and for his circus activities. 

Richard was born in Bessines, Deux-Sevres. In the 1970s–1980s, he owned and managed three major circuses, two theme parks near Paris, La Mer de Sable and La Vallée des Peaux-Rouges, and a private zoo in his property of Ermenonville, Oise. He died on 12 December 2001 in Senlis, aged 80.

Filmography

1947: Six heures à perdre (directed by Alex Joffé Jean Lévitte) – Le sergent de ville
1949: Mission à Tanger (directed by André Hunebelle) – Le président
1949: I Like Only You – Un passager de l'avion
1950: Le Roi Pandore (directed by André Berthomieu) – Quichenette
1950: Adémaï au poteau-frontière (directed by Paul Colline)
1951: The King of the Bla Bla Bla – Jacques
1951: Bernard and the Lion (directed by Robert Dhéry) – Le brigadier
1951: Le passage de Vénus
1952: Le Costaud des Batignolles (directed by Guy Lacourt) – L'inspecteur de police
1952: Les Sept Péchés capitaux – Le paysan (segment "Gourmandise, La / Gluttony")
1952: La Demoiselle et son revenant (directed by Marc Allégret) – Ricard
1952: Drôle de noce (directed by Léo Joannon) – Joseph Bonhomme
1953: Deux de l'escadrille (directed by Maurice Labro) – Pierre Dourdan – dit 'Saucisse'
1953: Wonderful Mentality (directed by André Berthomieu) – Honoré Bonvalet
1953: Week-end à Paris (directed by Gordon Parry)
1953: Le Portrait de son père (directed by André Berthomieu) – Paul
1953: Cinema d'altri tempi – Pasquale
1954: Si Versailles m'était conté (directed by Sacha Guitry) – Du Croisy / Tartuffe
1954: Service Entrance (directed by Carlo Rim) – Jules Béchard
1954: Scènes de ménage – Des Rillettes
1954: The Cheerful Squadron – Il soldato Laperrine
1954: Les Deux font la paire (directed by André Berthomieu) – Achille Baluchet
1954: Casta Diva (directed by Carmine Gallone) – Domenico Fiorillo
1955: Chéri-Bibi (directed by Marcello Pagliero) – Chéri-bibi / Maxime du Touchais
1955: Madelon (directed by Jean Boyer) – Antoine Pichot
1955: Eléna et les hommes (directed by Jean Renoir) – Hector
1956: La vie est belle – L'employé
1956: Short Head (directed by Norbert Carbonnaux) – Ferdinan Galiveau, éleveur de volailles à Parthenay
1957: Nous autres à Champignol (directed by Jean Bastia) – Claudius Binoche
1957: La Peau de l'ours (directed by Claude Boissol) – Commissaire Étienne Ledru
1957: C'est arrivé à 36 chandelles – Jean Richard (uncredited)
1957: Les Truands (directed by Carlo Rim) – Alexandre Benoit
1958: En bordée (directed by Pierre Chevalier) – Prosper Cartahu
1958: Life Together (directed by Clément Duhour) – André Le Lorrain
1959: Cigarettes, Whiskey and Wild Women – Le client assommé qui demande du wisky (uncredited)
1959: Le Gendarme de Champignol (directed by Jean Bastia) – Claudius Binoche
1959: Messieurs les ronds de cuir (directed by Henri Diamant-Berger) – Boudin
1959: Vous n'avez rien à déclarer? (directed by Clément Duhour) – Frontignac
1959: Arrêtez le massacre (directed by André Hunebelle) – Antoine Martin
1959: Mon pote le gitan (directed by François Gir) – Pittuiti
1959: The Goose of Sedan (directed by Helmut Käutner) – Leon Riffard
1959: Certains l'aiment froide (directed by Jean Bastia and Guy Lionel) – Jérôme Valmorin
1960: Tête folle (directed by Robert Vernay)
1960: Candide ou l'optimisme au XXe siècle – Le trafiquant du marché noir / Black Marketeer
1960: Les Tortillards (directed by Jean Bastia) – César Beauminet
1960: Les Fortiches (directed by Georges Combret) – Dédé
1961: The Fenouillard Family (directed by Yves Robert) – Agénor Fenouillard
1961: Ma femme est une panthère (directed by Raymond Bailly) – Roger
1961: La Belle Américaine (directed by Robert Dhéry) – le serrurier
1961:  (directed by Géza von Radványi) – Siméon
1961:  (directed by Géza von Radványi) – Siméon
1962: La Guerre des boutons (directed by Yves Robert) – Lebrac's father
1962: Tartarin de Tarascon (directed by Francis Blanche) – Le directeur du cirque 'Mitaine'
1962: Un clair de lune à Maubeuge (directed by Jean Chérasse) – Philibert
1962: Nous irons à Deauville (directed by Francis Rigaud) – Le plombier – M. Simeon
1962: Du mouron pour les petits oiseaux (directed by Marcel Carné) – Louis – le boucher
1963: The Bamboo Stroke (directed by Jean Boyer) – Albert
1963: Dragées au poivre (directed by Jacques Baratier) – Lepetit (le nounou 2)
1963: Bebert and the Train (directed by Yves Robert) – M. Martin
1964: Clémentine chérie (directed by Pierre Chevalier) – Auguste
1964: Jealous as a Tiger (directed by Darry Cowl) – Le monsieur à la voiture accidentée
1964: Allez France (directed by Robert Dhéry and Pierre Tchernia) – Un français dans le bus
1964: Comment épouser un premier ministre (directed by Michel Boisrond) – Le promoteur
1964: Le Dernier tiercé (directed by Richard Pottier) – Laredon
1965: La Bonne occase (directed by Michel Drach)
1965: Black Humor – Polyte – segment 1 'La Bestiole'
1965: Les Mordus de Paris – M. Durand
1965: La Corde au cou (directed by Joseph Lisbona) – Arthur
1965: The Double Bed – Father
1965: La tête du client (directed by Jacques Poitrenaud) – Docteur Tannait
1965: L'Or du duc (directed by Jacques Baratier)
1965: Les Bons Vivants (directed by Gilles Grangier and Georges Lautner) – Paul Arnaud (segment "Bons vivants, Les")
1965: The Lace Wars (directed by René Clair) – Le Prince de Beaulieu
1966: Le Caïd de Champignol (directed by Jean Bastia) – Claudius Binoche
1966: San Antonio - Sale temps pour les mouches (directed by Guy Lefranc) – L'inspecteur principal Bérurier
1967: Le Plus Vieux Métier du monde (directed by Claude Autant-Lara and Mauro Bolognini) – Le commissaire du peuple (segment "Mademoiselle Mimi")
1967: Bang Bang (directed by Serge Piolet) – Paulo
1967: Demeure chaste et pure
1967: Cecile est morte (directed by Claude Barma)
1968: Béru et ces dames (directed by Guy Lefranc) – L'inspecteur principal Bérurier
1969: L'Auvergnat et l'Autobus – Jean Richard
1969: La Maison de campagne (directed by Jean Girault) – Bertrand Boiselier
1969: Du blé en liasses – Bauchard
1972: Le Viager (directed by Pierre Tchernia) – Jo (un voyou) (cameo)
1981: Signé Furax (directed by Marc Simenon) – Maigret

References

 The complete guide to Asterix by Peter Kessler

External links
 
 Circopedia.org: Jean Richard

1921 births
2001 deaths
French male film actors
French male television actors
French circus performers
University of Burgundy alumni
French National Academy of Dramatic Arts alumni